Spencer Cowper (1713–1774) was Dean of Durham Cathedral from 1746 to 1774, known also for his early contributions to meteorology and his liking for poetry and music.

Life and work

Cowper was the younger son of William Cowper, the first Earl and the first Lord Chancellor of Great Britain, and his second wife Mary Clavering. He was the cousin of the poet William Cowper. Along with his religious duties as Dean of Durham, he kept a naturalist's journal which included records of the local meteorology.

Some of Cowper's sermons survive, as does a collection of his letters published in 1956.

Relatives

References

External links

Deans of Durham
Parson-naturalists
British meteorologists
1713 births
1774 deaths
Younger sons of earls